d'Ussel is a surname. Notable persons with that surname include:
Eble d'Ussel (fl. c. 1200), Limousin troubadour
Elias d'Ussel (fl. c. 1200), Limousin troubadour
Gui d'Ussel (fl. 1195–1209), Limousin troubadour
Peire d'Ussel (fl. c. 1200), Limousin troubadour
Jeanne d'Ussel (marriage in 1371), countess of Forez